Olga Lychkina (born 17 July 1968) is a Russian freestyle skier. She competed in the women's moguls event at the 1992 Winter Olympics.

References

1968 births
Living people
Russian female freestyle skiers
Olympic freestyle skiers of the Unified Team
Freestyle skiers at the 1992 Winter Olympics
Place of birth missing (living people)